Li Huanzhi, originally Li Zhaocai, also known as Li Zhonghuan (2 January 1919 – 19 March 2000), was a Chinese classical composer of the twentieth century. Born in Hong Kong, his ancestors came from Jinjiang City, Quanzhou, Fujian, and his mother was Taiwanese.

Biography
Li studied in several primary and middle schools in Hong Kong, Xiamen, and Quanzhou from 1925 to 1935. In 1936 he entered the National Music College in Shanghai to learn harmony from Xiao Youmei.

In 1938, Li went to Yan'an, where he studied at the Music Department of Lu Xun Arts College. After completing the courses, he later studied composing and conducting with Xian Xinghai. Following his graduation he remained there as a faculty member.

After the Second Sino-Japanese War, Li went to Zhangjiakou to take the chair of the music department of North China Associated University. Since the founding of the People's Republic of China, Li was appointed as the master of music working party of the Central Conservatory of Music, the art director of the Central Ensemble of Songs and Dances, the master of the China Central Chinese Orchestra, etc.

In 1985, he was elected as the chairman of the Chinese Musicians' Association.

He had three sons with his wife, Li Qun: Li Dakang, Li Xiaokang, and Li Yikang. Li Dakang is a professional DJ.

He died in Beijing in 2000.

Notable works
Here are some of Li's notable works:

Spring Festival Overture
Nomad Flute
High Mountains, Flowing Water
Socialism is Good
Shepherd Elegy
Yellow Flowers
Guard Our Motherland
Ode to the Youth (青年颂|青年頌)
March of Victory 
Su Wu
Fantasia Miluo River

Notes

1919 births
2000 deaths
20th-century classical composers
Chinese classical composers
Chinese male classical composers
Hong Kong male composers
Hong Kong composers
Musicians from Fujian
20th-century Chinese musicians
20th-century male musicians